Pamela J. Green is Crawford H. Greenewalt Chair, Professor of Plant and Soil Sciences and Professor of Marine Studies at the University of Delaware. She has researched the uses for RNA, one of the three major biological macromolecules that are essential for all known forms of life.

Early career
Green received her B.S. for Biology from Purdue University in 1979 and her Ph.D. for Biochemistry and Molecular Biology from Stony Brook University in 1985.

Research areas
Green's lab researches on post-transcriptional mechanisms which regulate the expression of genes in higher plants. The lab is interested in the fate of mRNA molecules which have their role as intermediates in the gene expression process.

Publications 
Jeong, D.H., Green, P.J., Methods for validation of miRNA sequence variants and the cleavage of their targets. Methods, 58:  135-143 (2012), EPub 2012 Aug 17.

References

External links
 Delaware Biotechnology Institute

American molecular biologists
University of Delaware faculty
Living people
American women biologists
20th-century American women scientists
21st-century American women scientists
Year of birth missing (living people)
Stony Brook University alumni
Purdue University alumni
American women academics